The Play-offs of the 1996 Fed Cup Europe/Africa Zone Group II were the final stages of the Group II Zonal Competition involving teams from Europe and Africa. Those that qualified for this stage placed first and second in their respective pools.

The four teams were then paired up the team from a different placing of the other group for a play-off tie, with the winners being promoted to Group I in 1997.

Poland vs. Denmark

Finland vs. Luxembourg

Israel vs. Lithuania

Ukraine vs. Turkey

See also
Fed Cup structure

References

External links
 Fed Cup website

1996 Fed Cup Europe/Africa Zone